is a passenger railway station located in the city of  Yokosuka, Kanagawa Prefecture, Japan, operated by the private railway company Keikyū.

Lines
Shioiri Station is served by the Keikyū Main Line and is located 49.2 kilometers from the northern terminus of the line at Shinagawa  Station in Tokyo.

Station layout
The station consists of two opposed elevated side platforms with the station building underneath. Most of the station is built on an embankment, and the platforms abut a tunnel towards the Yokosuka-chūō side.

Platform screen doors were installed on 12 March 2022 and are scheduled to go into operation by April 2022.

Platforms

History
The station was renamed  on October 1, 1940, and to its present name on September 1, 1961.

Keikyū introduced station numbering to its stations on 21 October 2010; Shioiri Station was assigned station number KK58.

Passenger statistics
In fiscal 2019, the station was used by an average of 18,162 passengers daily. 

The passenger figures for previous years are as shown below.

Surrounding area
 Midorigaoka Girls' Junior and Senior High School
Yokosuka City Shioiri Elementary School
Yokosuka Arts Theatre
Yokosuka Station
Verny Park

See also
 List of railway stations in Japan

References

External links

 

Railway stations in Kanagawa Prefecture
Railway stations in Japan opened in 1930
Keikyū Main Line
Railway stations in Yokosuka, Kanagawa